Bobillier may refer to:
Étienne Bobillier (1798–1840), French mathematician
Nadège Bobillier (born 1988), French figure skater
Bobillier (crater), a lunar crater